Aizpute Parish is an administrative unit of South Kurzeme Municipality, Latvia.  The parish has a population of 1003 (as of 1/07/2010) and covers an area of 88.9 km2.

Villages of Aizpute parish 
 Dubeņmuiža
 Ievade
 Kūdra
 Lavīži
 Mangaļi
 Marijas
 Padure
 Rokasbirze

South Kurzeme Municipality
Parishes of Latvia
Courland